Kate Firth (born 1962) is a British professional voice coach and stage actress, and sister to actors Colin and Jonathan Firth. She has a therapeutic counsellor background in the field of human communication, and extensive experience in theatre, psychology and applied linguistics.

She was born in Nigeria in 1962. Her parents, Shirley Jean (née Rolles) and David Norman Lewis Firth were both children of Methodist missionaries in India, and after their marriage worked as teachers in Nigeria and other cities. The family moved many times, from Essex to Billericay and Brentwood, and then to St. Louis, Missouri (USA) for a year when Kate was ten years old and her brother Colin was twelve. Upon returning to England the family settled in Winchester, where her father became a history lecturer at King Alfred's College and her mother was a comparative religion lecturer at King Alfred's College Winchester (now the University of Winchester).

She attended Queen Mary College (1982–85), San Diego State University (1990–92), and Middlesex University (2011). She initially pursued a career in acting, studying drama at university. After an acting stint with the Royal National Theatre, she received a postgraduate diploma in Voice Studies from The Central School of Speech and Drama and a postgraduate certificate in Psychosynthesis Therapeutic Counselling. She married after university and moved to California.

Upon returning to England in 1992, Firth joined the Bridge Theatre Company in Sherringham. She lives and works in London.

For The King's Speech (2010), she coached her older brother Colin to prepare for his role as King George VI in the award-winning film and to master stammering.

Theatre credits
 Three Days of Rain (Donmar)
 Taming of the Shrew (Bristol Old Vic)
 Lula in Dutchman (Experimental Theatre)
 Hedda Gabler (Bridge Theatre Company, 1992)
 The Merchant of Venice (New End, 1993)

References

External links
 
 Biography of Kate Firth
 Kate Firth
 Voice Studies graduate advises on King’s Speech
 Specialists in Voice Coaches

1962 births
Living people
Vocal coaches
English stage actresses
Alumni of Queen Mary University of London
20th-century English actresses
21st-century English actresses
Date of birth missing (living people)
Place of birth missing (living people)
San Diego State University alumni
Alumni of Middlesex University